Chaetostoma tachiraense is a species of catfish in the family Loricariidae. It is a freshwater fish native to South America, where it occurs in the Catatumbo River basin at altitudes of up to 1,000 to 2,000 m (3,281 to 6,562 ft). The species reaches 8.7 cm (3.4 inches) SL.

References 

tachiraense
Fish described in 1944
Catfish of South America